The Volvo PV800 Series (nicknamed the Volvo Sugga, literally the Sow) is a taxicab manufactured by Volvo from 1938 until 1958. The Sow series dominated the Swedish taxicab market during the 1940s and 1950s.

During World War II and in the 1950s, Volvo built a four-wheel drive off-road vehicle for the Swedish Armed Forces and Belgian Armed Forces, using the mechanical parts from Volvo’s small trucks, combined with much of the body from the PV-800 series Sow.



PV800-810 

The PV801 (with a glass division between the front and rear seat) and the PV802 (without the glass division) were introduced in 1938 and superseded the TR670 Series. The chassis and body were all new but the side-valve engine was the same as in the older cars. The front end was also used on Volvo’s smallest lorry, the LV100 Series.

The PV802 could be used as a spare ambulance. After folding all seats on the car’s right side, a stretcher could be loaded through the bootlid. Volvo continued to build commercial chassis versions, which were often used as basis for proper ambulances.

During the Second World War Volvo built a four-wheel drive off-road vehicle, called Terrängpersonvagn m/43 (TPV), for the Swedish Armed Forces and Belgian Armed Forces. The mechanical parts were based on Volvo’s smaller lorries and the body came from the Sow.

Versions 
PV800: 1940-47, 37 cars built, commercial chassis
PV801: 1938-47, 550 cars built, with glass partition
PV802: 1938-47, 1081 cars built, without glass partition
PV810: 1938-47, 180 cars built, commercial chassis on  wheelbase
TPV: 1944-46, 210 cars built, military off-road vehicle

PV821-824 

In 1947 the PV800 was succeeded by PV821 and PV822. The cars were updated with the slightly stronger ED engine and the column-mounted gear lever from the PV 60.

Versions 
PV821: 1948, 200 cars built, with glass partition
PV822: 1947-48, 300 cars built, without glass partition
PV823: 1947-48, 150 cars built, commercial chassis
PV824: 1947-48, 150 cars built, commercial chassis on  wheelbase

PV831-834 

In the autumn of 1950 the model returned with a new front, similar to the front of the PV444 and the small lorry L340. The cars were renamed PV831 and PV832, respectively. In 1953 independent front suspension became optional. That same year, a civilian executive version, Disponent, saw the light of day.

By the end of the 1950s the Sow was quite outdated. Volvo planned for a successor, project P358, which was to be a large car powered by a V8, but that car never materialized, so when production of the PV800 Series ended in 1958 Volvo left the taxi market unattended. The recently introduced P120 Amazon was too small to serve as a taxicab and there were almost ten years before Volvo presented a new car, suitable for taxi use, the 144.

TP21 

In 1953 Volvo introduced  a successor to the TPV for the armed forces, the four-wheel drive
Raptgb 915 (military name), TP21/P2104 (Volvo military designation), P2104 (Volvo civilian designation). It was powered by the well proven , 3.67 litre inline 6 mated to a Volvo E9 gearbox. The military version used to be called "Terräng-Sugga", though today the enthusiasts of this particular model seem to have somewhat high-jacked the nickname "Suggan".

Versions 
PV831/832: 1950-57, 4135 cars built
PV833/834: 1950-58, 2081 cars built, commercial chassis
TP21: 1953-58, 720 cars built, military off-road vehicle

Also see the Volvo L-3314.

Gallery

References 
Volvo Personvagnar-från 20-tal till 80-tal by Björn-Eric Lindh, 1984.

External links 

Volvo Cars Heritage.
Volvo Museum.
Storvolvoklubben 
Volvo TP21 sidan 

PV800 Series
Rear-wheel-drive vehicles
Cars introduced in 1938
Cars introduced in 1950
Cars introduced in 1953
Taxis of Sweden